Cæcilie Norby (born 9 September 1964) is a Danish jazz and rock singer.

She was born in Frederiksberg, Denmark, into a musical family. Her father, Erik Norby, is classical composer and her mother, Solveig Lumholt, is an opera singer. She was a founding member of the band Street Beat in 1982. For two years, she was a member of the jazz-rock band Frontline. From 1985 to 1993, she worked with singer Nina Forsberg in the rock band One-Two. During the 1990s, she turned to jazz and released her first solo album for Blue Note.

The self-titled debut recording was co-produced by Niels Lan Doky as was her following album My Corner of the Sky from 1996, which prominently featured American musicians like pianists David Kikoski, Joey Calderazzo and Terri Lyne Carrington on drums. Scott Robinson and Randy Brecker already appeared on her debut as guests each on one track. Michael Brecker contributes to yet another track. The repertoire for both recordings included only a few jazz standards like "Summertime" or "Just One of Those Things", instead she and Lan Doky arranged classic popular songs for a jazz line-up, like "Wild Is the Wind", "By the Time I Get to Phoenix" and a track by Curtis Mayfield on the first album, "The Look of Love", "Life on Mars", "Spinning Wheel" and "Set Them Free" by Sting on the second. For both albums Norby also wrote lyrics to compositions by Randy Brecker, Chick Corea, Don Grolnick and Wayne Shorter. Both albums gained wide attention and five-digit sales, especially in Denmark and also in Japan.

Her third album Queen of Bad Excuses, released in 1999, was a collaboration between her and Lars Danielsson, who already played bass throughout My Corner of the Sky. This time all compositions are originals by Norby, while she and Danielsson arranged, programmed and produced all tracks together. Danielsson played also guitar, cello, electric piano, keyboards and even drums on one track. With Ben Besiakov and long-time companion Lars Jansson on piano, Anders Kjellberg and Per Lindvall from Sweden alternating on drums with Billy Hart, who was also part of her debut recording, the line-up is accentuated by the guitar of John Scofield on more than half of the album, and saxophonist Hans Ulrik and Xavier Desandre Navarre on percussion.

Awards 
1985: Ben Webster Prize
1996: Best Recording Album in Japan
1997: Simon Spies Soloist Prize
2000: Wilhelm Hansen Music Prize
2010: IFPI's Honorary Award

Discography 
With Frontline 
1985: Frontline 
1986: Frontlife

With One Two
1986: One Two
1990: Hvide Løgne
1993: Getting Better

With DR Big Band
2009: Jazz Divas of Scandinavia (Red Dot)

Solo studio albums

Solo live albums

Solo compilation albums

References

External links 
 Official website

1964 births
Living people
People from Frederiksberg
Danish jazz singers
Danish women singers
English-language singers from Denmark